Visnagar is one of the 182 Legislative Assembly constituencies of Gujarat state in India. It is part of Mahesana district. It is numbered as 22-Visnagar.

List of segments
This assembly seat represents the following segments,

 Visnagar Taluka

Members of Legislative Assembly

Election results

2022

2017

2012

See also
 List of constituencies of the Gujarat Legislative Assembly
 Mahesana district

References

External links
 

Assembly constituencies of Gujarat
Mehsana district